John Holden was a missionary Anglican bishop.

Biography
He was born in 1882 and educated at Durham University He was ordained in 1907 and went to work for the Church Missionary Society in China, becoming in time an archdeacon. In 1923 he became Bishop of Kwangsi-Hunan  and was translated to Szechwan (Diocese of Western China) in 1933 and later to Western Szechwan. Returning to England in 1938 he became an Assistant Bishop of Truro (until death), Vicar of St Budock (until 1944), a Canon Residentiary of Truro Cathedral (1944–1947) and then Archdeacon of Cornwall. He died on 14 August 1949.

See also
 Anglicanism in Sichuan

References

1882 births
Archdeacons of Cornwall
Anglican missionary bishops in China
1949 deaths
Anglican missionaries in Sichuan
Anglican missionaries in China
English Anglican missionaries
20th-century Anglican bishops in China
Alumni of St John's College, Durham
Diocese of Szechwan
Anglican bishops of Kwangsi-Hunan
Anglican bishops of Western China
Anglican bishops of West Szechwan